The Fiddletown AVA is an American Viticultural Area in Amador County, California, United States. The region was first settled in 1849, during the California Gold Rush. Settlers who stayed in the area eventually planted grape vines, which became abundant by the end of the nineteenth century. About 20% of the wine produced in Amador County comes from Fiddletown AVA.

Modern History 
The Fiddletown, CA AVA area can be considered the upper Amador wine growing region, as it sits at higher elevation to both the Shenandoah Valley AVA, anchored by Plymouth, CA, and Sutter Creek, CA, and the wineries that run along eastern CA 16 to CA 49, more centered around Ione, CA. This area historically like all wine regions of the California Sierra Foothills started with mostly European settlers and the California Gold Rush of the 1850's. The region went mostly dormant for decades, but has been picking up since the 1970's and 1980's when the area became a growing retirement region, and the expanse of the population centers of the Central Valley and even Nevada added significant wine touring to the area. With this resurgence of local wine buyers, the regions of interior California, especially the Sierra Foothills,  started a new resurgence with more plantings and wine making. The Fiddletown AVA is more high mountain grapes, with Syrah and related Rhone varietals doing well, and traditional Italian grapes such as Barbera, Tempranillo and Zinfandel being the historical favorites of the greater region. Grapes traditionally making up Bordeaux wine, such as Cabernet Sauvignon, Cabernet Franc are grown all across the region, just less common. Dominant white varietals grown in the region are Viognier, Grenache Blanc, Albarino, Rousanne, and others. Some vineyards in this area can stretch to over 3,000 feet above sea level creating a distinct difference to the lower elevations. A few celebrated winemakers especially focus on this area. A winery collective and store exists known as Amador 360 Winery Collective, which can give you a diverse introduction to this AVA specifically.

Wineries in the Fiddletown AVA
Damas Vineyards

Damas is one of the rare wineries that places Fiddletown AVA on their labels, many wineries do not. The wine bottles usually say Amador County.  The winery roads, where retail exists, in Amador County, are primarily in the California Shenandoah Valley AVA area, and Shenandoah Road, and further to the south is the Fiddletown AVA,  just east of Plymouth, CA, up Fiddletown Road. See the California Shenandoah Valley AVA wiki page for a more complete list of wineries that span both roads.

References 

Geography of Amador County, California
American Viticultural Areas
American Viticultural Areas of California
1983 establishments in California